Tectariopsis is an extinct genus of sea snails, marine gastropod mollusks, in the family Turbinidae.

Species
Species within the genus Tectariopsis include:
 † Tectariopsis henrici (Caillat, 1835)

References

 
Gastropods described in 1888
Monotypic gastropod genera